François or Francis Le Clerc, known as "Jambe de Bois" ("Peg Leg"), (died 1563) was a 16th-century French privateer, originally from Normandy. He is credited as the first pirate in the modern era to have a "peg leg".

He was often the first to board an enemy vessel during an attack or raid. It was this brazen style that eventually caused him to suffer the loss of a leg and severe damage to one arm while fighting the English at Guernsey in 1549. Although many pirates would have had their careers ended by such an injury, Le Clerc refused to retire and instead expanded the scope of his piracy by financing the voyages and attacks of other pirates as well.

Despite his wounds, Le Clerc led major raids against the Spanish, who nicknamed him "Pata de Palo" ("Peg Leg"). In 1553, he assumed overall command of seven pirate craft and three royal vessels, the latter commanded by himself, Jacques de Sores and Robert Blundel.  This same year he attacked the port of Santa Cruz de La Palma, in the Canary Islands, which he looted and set on fire, destroying a large number of buildings.

This strong fleet raided San Germán in Puerto Rico and methodically looted the ports of Hispaniola and Cuba from south to north, stealing hides and cannon as they traveled.  They sacked Santiago de Cuba in 1554, occupied it for a month, and left with 80,000 pesos in treasure. So completely devastated was Cuba's first capital that it was soon completely eclipsed by Havana and never recovered its former prosperity.

Richer booty was taken on the return voyage as the corsairs plundered Las Palmas on Grand Canary Island and captured a Genoese carrack.

He and his crew of 330 men were the first Europeans to settle the island of Saint Lucia, and used the nearby Pigeon Island to target Spanish treasure galleons.

In 1560, while awaiting a Spanish treasure fleet carrying a cargo of bullion, he caused a great deal of damage to settlements along the coast of Panama.

In April 1562, Protestants in several Norman cities rebelled against their Roman Catholic king. Queen Elizabeth I of England dispatched British troops to occupy Le Havre until June 1563. Le Clerc joined the English invaders and ravaged French shipping. In March 1563, he asked for a large pension as a reward for his actions. Wounded in his pride when Elizabeth turned down his request, he sailed for the Azores Islands. He was killed there in 1563, while hunting down Spanish treasure ships.

References

Further reading
 Maxwell, Kenneth. Naked Tropics: Essays on Empire and Other Rogues. London: Routledge (UK), 2003. 
 Mcgrath, John Terrence. The French in Early Florida: In the Eye of the Hurricane. Gainesville: University Press of Florida, 2000. 
 de la Roncière, Charles. Histoire de la marine française (History of the French Navy). Paris, 1910. https://archive.org/details/histoiredelamari04larouoft
 de la Roncière, Charles. Henri II précurseur de Colbert. Paris, Bibliothèque de l'École des chartes, 1905 - page 639 https://www.persee.fr/doc/bec_0373-6237_1905_num_66_1_461347
 Mémoires de la Société nationale académique de Cherbourg, Vol. XXIII, Saint-Lo, 1942 - https://gallica.bnf.fr/ark:/12148/bpt6k6561152f.r=.langFR.textePage

External links
François Le Clerc, at Rob Ossian's Pirate Cove 
Famous Pirates

1563 deaths
Military personnel from Normandy
French privateers
Year of birth unknown